Team Uniqa was an Austrian professional cycling team, which competed in elite road bicycle racing events such as the UCI Women's Road World Cup. For the 2009 season the team merged with fellow Austrian team – Elk Haus.

Major wins
2005
Prologue Tour de l'Aude, Christiane Soeder

2007
Stage 5 Tour de Feminin – Krasna Lip, Monika Schachl

National champions
2007
 Austria Road Race, Daniella Pintarelli
 France Road Race, Edwige Pitel
2008
 Luxembourg Road Race, Nathalie Lamborelle
 Austria Road Race, Monika Schachl

References

Cycling teams based in Austria
UCI Women's Teams
Cycling teams established in 2008